Enrico Chiesa (born 29 December 1970) is an Italian football coach and former striker.

A prolific goalscorer, Chiesa played for several Italian clubs throughout his career, and performed regularly in Serie A for over a decade, winning titles with Sampdoria, Parma, and Fiorentina; he later also spent a spell with Lazio. He moved to Siena where he became a household name and, thanks to his goals, the Tuscan side stayed in the top division for many seasons. He retired with Figline in 2010, the club with which he subsequently began his coaching career. He won the 1998–99 UEFA Cup and Coppa Italia with Parma, finishing the former tournament as the top scorer, with 8 goals. At international level, he represented the Italy national team on 17 occasions between 1996 and 2001, scoring 7 goals, and was also part of the Italian squads that took part at UEFA Euro 1996 and the 1998 FIFA World Cup.

He is father to Federico Chiesa, who is a professional footballer himself currently playing for Juventus in Serie A.

Club career
Born in Genoa, Chiesa made his early playing footsteps at amateur club Pontedecimo (1986–87). He then moved to Sampdoria, for which he made his debut on 16 April 1989 in a 1–0 loss at Roma in the 1988–89 Serie A. He then played for Teramo of Serie C2 and successively Chieti of Serie C1 before returning to Sampdoria in 1992. Failing to impress, he then joined Modena in Serie B for the 1993–94 season, and later Cremonese during the 1994–95 season, where he scored 14 goals in their Serie A campaign. In 1995, he returned again with the blucerchiati, forming a notable attacking duo with Roberto Mancini, and scoring 22 goals in 27 matches in Serie A.

In 1996, he was signed by rising club Parma, and contributed to his team's second-place finish behind Juventus, scoring 14 goals in the Serie A during his first season at the club. The second-place result allowed Parma to qualify for the UEFA Champions League the following season. With Parma, Chiesa won a UEFA Cup, a Coppa Italia, and a Supercoppa Italiana during the highly successful 1998–99 season, in which Parma also finished in fourth place in the Serie A. Chiesa became one of the best strikers in Italian football (when not injured). During his time at the club, he also formed a successful partnership with Argentine star striker Hernán Crespo, as the duo averaged 10–15 goals a season each. They also each scored in the 1999 UEFA Cup Final victory over Marseille, a competition in which Chiesa finished top scorer, with 8 goals.

In 1999, he was signed by Fiorentina for 28 billion lire (€14.46 million), a team looking to expand and bring in better players, in an attempt to keep club captain and talisman Gabriel Batistuta. Despite making regular appearances in his first season for La Viola, Chiesa was fighting for a place with Predrag Mijatović among others, and also had spells where he was out of form, and in the end only managed 6 goals in the League. In the 2000–01 season, Batistuta left for Roma and Fiorentina were plagued with injuries and financial problems. Meanwhile, Chiesa became the main striker for the club under manager Roberto Mancini, supported by playmaker Rui Costa, and scored 22 goals in 30 matches, finishing amongst the top 5 highest scorers in the league and helping Fiorentina to win the 2000–01 Coppa Italia over his former club, Parma, in the final; in the second leg at home, he set up Nuno Gomes's goal in a 1–1 draw, which allowed Fiorentina to clinch the title 2–1 on aggregate. The 2001–02 campaign proved to be a very difficult one: Chiesa started the campaign off strongly, scoring five goals in the first five matches of the season, but was ruled out for the rest of the season after sustaining a serious injury to his knee ligaments against Venezia on matchday five; left without Chiesa to lead the club's attack, Fiorentina were ultimately relegated at the end of the season. As a result of Fiorentina's relegation and financial troubles, Chiesa subsequently moved to Lazio for the following season, where he however failed to play at his personal best.

In 2003, he joined Siena, where he became a fan favourite and a key player in the club's Serie A history, impressively reaching double scoring figures in Serie A during his first three seasons at the club. Despite a very poor 2006–07 season in which Chiesa was not able to score a single goal in Serie A, he was backed by the club and new trainer Andrea Mandorlini, who explicitly stated that he felt that Chiesa was still important to the team, and that he expected at least 15 goals from him in their 2007–08 Serie A campaign. However, he played only twice, scoring no goals once again, before he was signed by Figline of the Lega Pro Second Division. He scored five goals with Figline, thus giving his contribution to the team's promotion to the Lega Pro Prima Divisione. In the following season, his last as a footballer, he played a limited number of games due to suffering a fractured leg, an injury which forced him to stay out of contention for most of the season.

International career
Chiesa played for the Italian team from 1996 to 2001, collecting a total of 22 caps with 7 goals. Chiesa made his senior international debut in a 2–2 friendly draw against Belgium on 29 May 1996 in Cremona, marking the occasion with a goal. He was subsequently selected by manager Arrigo Sacchi to play for Italy at the UEFA Euro 1996 tournament later that year, ahead of other established strikers such as Roberto Baggio, Gianluca Vialli, and Giuseppe Signori. Chiesa appeared in two group stage matches, the first in a 2–1 defeat against the Czech Republic, where he scored Italy's only goal of the match, and the second in a 0–0 draw against Germany, as Italy were eliminated in the first round. He also was called up to the 1998 FIFA World Cup by manager Cesare Maldini as a replacement for Fabrizio Ravanelli. He appeared in Italy's opening group match of the 1998 World Cup, which ended in a 2–2 draw against Chile, also appearing as a substitute in the 1–0 victory in the round of 16 match against Norway. Italy were eliminated in the quarter finals on penalties by hosts and eventual champions France. Under manager Dino Zoff, Chiesa appeared in Italy's 6–2 friendly win over the FIFA World Stars on 16 December 1998, organised to commemorate the centenary of the Italian Football Federation, scoring a hat-trick. He also scored a goal in a 4–0 victory over Wales in a European qualifying match in Bologna, on 5 June 1999. He made his final appearance for Italy under Giovanni Trapattoni, in Italy's 1–0 friendly win over South Africa in Perugia, on 25 April 2001. Alongside Alessandro Del Piero, Chiesa holds the unique record for the most goals scored by an Italian international coming off the bench (5). Chiesa is currently the last player to manage 2 goals in his first two Italy appearances.

Style of play
A prolific goalscorer, Chiesa was considered one of the most exciting and dynamic strikers in Italy during the mid-'90s. A quick, strong, hardworking, and elegant player, he was mainly deployed in a central role as a main striker throughout his career, but he could also play off of another forward as a supporting forward or on the wing, due to his vision, versatility, good technique, close control at speed, and tactical intelligence, which also enabled him to create goalscoring opportunities for his teammates. Possessing pace, stamina, good offensive movement, and a powerful and accurate shot with either foot from both inside and outside the box, he excelled during counter-attacks, and was known for his ability to make attacking runs into the area, and quickly strike the ball first time while on the run; he was also equally known for his ability to score with powerful or bending strikes from free-kicks, and is the joint ninth-highest goalscorer of all time from free kicks in Serie A, with 13 goals, alongside Michel Platini and Álvaro Recoba. Fabio Capello described Chiesa as a complete forward, and as a cross between Gigi Riva and Paolo Rossi, due to his opportunism, anticipation, and excellent striking ability, which enabled him to excel acrobatically in the air, and execute spectacular volleys. In addition to his goalscoring ability as a footballer, he was also known for his dedication, professionalism and his correct behaviour on the pitch, although, despite his reputation, his career was affected by several injuries.

Coaching career
In June 2010 it was announced that Chiesa was appointed the new head coach of Figline for the 2010–11 season. The experience however lasted a very short time, as Figline was excluded from the Italian leagues in July.

Personal life
Chiesa's son, Federico, is also a footballer who currently plays for Juventus.

Career statistics

Club
Source:

1 Including 1 match in 2001 Supercoppa Italiana.

International
Source:

Honours

Club
Sampdoria
European Cup Winners' Cup: 1989–90

Parma
Coppa Italia: 1998–99
UEFA Cup: 1998–99

Fiorentina
Coppa Italia: 2000–01
Supercoppa Italiana runner-up: 2001

Figline
Lega Pro Seconda Divisione: 2008–09
Supercoppa di Lega Seconda Divisione: 2008–09

Individual
Guerin d'Oro: 1996
UEFA Cup Top scorer: 1998–99 (8 goals)

Notes

References

External links
Career profile at Gazzetta dello Sport.it  

Profile at A.C. Siena's official site  
National team statistics at FIGC.it 

1970 births
Living people
Footballers from Genoa
Association football forwards
Italian footballers
Italian football managers
Italy international footballers
U.C. Sampdoria players
Modena F.C. players
U.S. Cremonese players
Parma Calcio 1913 players
ACF Fiorentina players
S.S. Lazio players
A.C.N. Siena 1904 players
S.S. Chieti Calcio players
Serie A players
Serie B players
Serie C players
UEFA Euro 1996 players
1998 FIFA World Cup players
UEFA Cup winning players